WASA FC is a football club from St. Joseph in Trinidad and Tobago.

They were founded in 1996 and competes in the National Super League in Trinidad, of which they emerged champions in 2012.

Awards
 1998 – Eastern Football Association League Champions
 1999 – Eastern Football Association League Champions
 2001 – Eastern Football Association League Champions
 2002 – Eastern Football Association League Champions
 2004 – Eastern Football Association League Champions
 2006 – National FA Cup Champions
 2007 – National Super League Champions
 2008 – 3rd Place National Super League; President's Cup Champions (EFA)
 2010 – Eastern Football Association League Cup Champions
 2011 – Eastern Football Association Challenge Cup Champions; President's Cup (EFA); 2nd Place National Super League;
 2012 – Super League Champions

References

Sport in Trinidad and Tobago
Football clubs in Trinidad and Tobago